Martin Campbell-Kelly is an Emeritus Professor at the University of Warwick who has specialised in the history of computing.

Campbell-Kelly has served on the editorial board of the IEEE Annals of the History of Computing journal. He is a committee member of the Computer Conservation Society, a Specialist Group of the British Computer Society, and is a Gresham College lecturer.

Education
Campell-Kelly was educated at Sunderland Polytechnic where he was awarded a PhD in 1980 on the Foundations of computer programming in Britain 1945–1955.

Research
Campbell-Kelly has authored, edited numerous books and journal articles on the history of computing.

References

External links
 Martin Campbell-Kelly on ResearchGate

Year of birth missing (living people)
Living people
Alumni of the University of Sunderland
English computer scientists
English historians
Historians of science
Historians of technology
Computer science writers
Academics of the University of Warwick